Marta Pérez Miguel (born 19 April 1993) is a Spanish middle-distance runner. She competed in the women's 1500 metres at the 2017 World Championships in Athletics. In addition, she won a 1500 metres bronze at the 2018 Mediterranean Games.

International competitions

References

External links
 
 
 
 

1993 births
Living people
Spanish female middle-distance runners
World Athletics Championships athletes for Spain
Place of birth missing (living people)
Mediterranean Games bronze medalists for Spain
Mediterranean Games medalists in athletics
Athletes (track and field) at the 2018 Mediterranean Games
Athletes (track and field) at the 2020 Summer Olympics
Olympic athletes of Spain
21st-century Spanish women